On Ting is an MTR Light Rail stop located at ground level at Tuen Mun Heung Sze Wui Road between On Ting Estate and Yau Oi Estate, in Tuen Mun District. It began service on 18 September 1988 and belongs to Zone 2.

Currently, route 751 only serves this stop in Tin Yat direction. On Ting stop was originally the terminus of Light Rail routes until 2 February 1992, when Siu Lun stop was opened. Route 507 was extended to Tuen Mun Ferry Pier stop, routes 506 and 612 (both now cancelled) were diverted to Yau Oi, and On Ting station lost its terminus status.

MTR Light Rail stops
Former Kowloon–Canton Railway stations
Tuen Mun District
Railway stations in Hong Kong opened in 1988
MTR Light Rail stops named from housing estates